The Telangana Legislative Council, (officially in Kannada, Telangana Vidhana Parishad) is the upper house of the bicameral legislature of Telangana state in south eastern India.

Members of Telangana Legislative Council 
This is a list of current and past members of the Telangana Legislative Council. The state elects members for a term of 6 years. 14 members are indirectly elected by the state legislators, 14 members are elected by Local Authorities, 3 from Graduates constituencies and 3 from teachers constituencies. The Governor of Telangana nominates up to 6 eminent people as members from various fields.

Source

 Star (*) represents current members
 MLA - elected by Members of Telangana Legislative Assembly
 LA - Local Authorities
 GR - Graduates
 TR - Teachers
 NOM - Nominated

References 

 
Telangana Legislative Council
Members
Legislative Council